Glen Glenn may refer to:
 Glen Glenn (sound engineer) (1907–1960), American sound recorder and co-founder of the Glen Glenn Sound Company
 Glen Glenn Sound, sound studio
 Glen Glenn (singer) (1934–2022), American rockabilly singer